William David Gosbee (born 20 May 1961) better known as Bill Gosbee is a British fencer. He competed in the individual and team foil events at the 1984, 1988 and 1992 Summer Olympics. He was an five times British fencing champion, winning five foil titles at the British Fencing Championships, from 1984 to 1992.

References

External links
 

1961 births
Living people
British male fencers
Olympic fencers of Great Britain
Fencers at the 1984 Summer Olympics
Fencers at the 1988 Summer Olympics
Fencers at the 1992 Summer Olympics
Sportspeople from London